Joulutorttu  is a Christmas album by Eläkeläiset. It was released in December 2002 by Stupido Records, and spent two weeks in the Finnish top 10 album chart.

The mini-album contains 4 humppa-songs, all composed for this album. The songs on Joulutorttu are:

 Yksinäinen joulu ("Lonely Christmas") - sung by Kristian Voutilainen (music/words - Voutilainen)
 Humpaton joulu ("Christmas without humppa") - sung by Martti Varis (music/words - Martti Varis)
 Täydellinen joulu ("Perfect Christmas") - sung by Onni Varis (music/words - Onni Varis)
 Pahvinen joulu ("Cardboard Christmas") - sung by Lassi Kinnunen (music - Voutilainen, words - Onni Varis)

Players on the album were: Onni Varis, Martti Varis, Lassi Kinnunen, and Kristian Voutilainen. Marita Koskelo is credited as a special guest. The album was recorded and mixed by Kristian Voutilainen, and mastered by Mika Jussila at Finnvox.

References

2002 Christmas albums
Eläkeläiset albums